Camilo Ugo Carabelli (born 17 June 1999) is an Argentine professional tennis player.

He has a career high ATP singles ranking of world No. 96 achieved on 15 August 2022 and a doubles ranking of world No. 232 achieved on 21 March 2022.

Ugo Carabelli has won three ATP Challenger and four Futures singles titles.

Career

2022: Grand Slam debut & first win, top 100
At the 2022 French Open he qualified to make his Grand Slam main draw debut. He defeated former top-15, world No. 39 Aslan Karatsev in five sets  with a fifth set 10 points tiebreak, the first ever match in the French Open main draw since the new tiebreak rule was implemented, in a 4 hours 17 minutes match for his first Grand Slam win. As a result he made his top 150 debut in the rankings.

Following his third title at the 2022 Lima Challenger where he was the runner-up in 2021, he reached the top 100 at world No. 96 on 15 August 2022.

2023: First ATP 250 win
He recorded his first ATP 250 win as a qualifier at the 2023 Argentina Open defeating Daniel Elahi Galan.

Challenger and Futures/World Tennis Tour finals

Singles: 16 (7–9)

References

External links
 
 

1999 births
Living people
Argentine male tennis players
Tennis players from Buenos Aires